The 1971 NBA Finals was the championship series played at the conclusion of the National Basketball Association (NBA)'s 25th anniversary season of 1970–71. The Western Conference champion Milwaukee Bucks, who were founded as an expansion team three years earlier, swept the Eastern Conference champion Baltimore Bullets in four games. Baltimore had dethroned the 1969–70 NBA champion New York Knicks in the Eastern Conference finals.

The Bucks were the first Western Conference champions to win the league's championship since the St. Louis Hawks did so in 1958, and were the first expansion team in the NBA to win a championship since the NBA held its first expansion draft. (The Bullets originally started out as the Chicago Packers, an expansion team that began play in  before moving to Baltimore in 1963.) It was also the first NBA title by a Western Conference team that has not since folded or relocated.

The Bullets were forced to play Game 1 on a Wednesday night, just 48 hours after having defeated New York in Game 7 of the 1971 Eastern Conference Finals, then had to wait four days before playing Game 2.
Most other series were held in the 2-2-1-1-1 or 2-3-2 format (a 1-2-2-1-1 format was used in 1975 and 1978). It was also the last NBA Championship Series completed before May 1.

The series was broadcast by ABC with Chris Schenkel and Jack Twyman providing the commentary.

Until 2021, it was the Bucks' only and the city's second championship (with the other being the  Braves). The city's 49-year drought was the fourth longest title drought in the "Big 4" major professional sports leagues, behind Buffalo, San Diego and Vancouver.

Series summary

Bucks win series 4–0

Team rosters

Milwaukee Bucks

Baltimore Bullets

See also 
 1970–71 NBA season
 1971 NBA Playoffs

Notes

References

External links 
NBA History
Basketball-Reference
Milwaukee Bucks: Looking Back At The 1971 NBA Finals
Sports Illustrated: Oscar and the Bucks are No. 1

Finals
National Basketball Association Finals
NBA
Baltimore Bullets (1963–1973)
NBA Finals
NBA Finals
Basketball competitions in Milwaukee
Basketball competitions in Baltimore
1970s in Baltimore
1970s in Milwaukee
April 1971 sports events in the United States